Dola Purnima, also popularly known as Dola Jatra, Doul Utsav or Deul, is the major Holi festival of Braj region, Bangladesh and the Indian state of Odisha, Assam, Tripura and West Bengal.   This festival is dedicated to the divine couple of Radha and Krishna. It is usually celebrated on the full moon night or fifteenth day of the Falgun month mainly by Gopal community.

Significance

Pushtimarg 
In Vallabhacharya's  Pushtimarg tradition, Dolotsav is celebrated with high enthusiasm. The idols of Radha Krishna are placed in special swing called Hindola and their devotees plays with a variety of colours. The main centre of the attraction in Hori-Dol is the temple of Shrinathji, which is considered as the main place of worship for members of this tradition.

Radha Vallabha Sampradaya 
This festival is also celebrated with great fervor and enthusiasm in  Radha Vallabh Sampradaya and Haridasi Sampradaya where the idols of Radha Krishna are worshipped and offered colours and flowers to commence the festivities.

Gaudiya Vaishnavism 
In Gaudiya Vaishnavism, this festival is further more significant as it was the day when Chaitanya Mahaprabhu was born who was also worshipped as the combined avatar of Radha and Krishna. He was a great saint and a philosopher who played an important part in flourishing the Bhakti movement in India. He was also the founder of Gaudiya Vaishnavism tradition.

Celebration 
On this auspicious day, the murtis of Krishna and his beloved Radha, richly adorned and besmeared with colored powder. In Braj, Bengal, Odisha and Assam, the murtis of Radha Krishna are taken out in procession in a swinging palanquin, decorated with flowers, leaves, colored clothes and papers. The procession proceeds forward to the accompaniment of music, blaring of conch shells, trumpets horn and shouts of 'Joy' (Victory) and 'Hôri Bola'.

In the region of Assam, the festival is marked by singing songs, like "Phaku khele korunamoy" by the 16th Century Assamese poet Madhavdev, especially at the Barpeta Satra. The 15th century saint, artist and social reformer Srimanta Sankardev celebrated Doul at Bordowa in Nagaon, Assam. The festival also includes playing with colours made usually from flowers traditionally.

See also 
 Holi
 Lathmar Holi
 Hola Mohalla

Bibliography
Verma, Vanish (2002).  Fasts and Festivals of India. New Delhi: Diamond Pocket Books.

References

External links 
Bhatt,S. C., Bhargava, Gopal K. (2006) Land and People of Indian States and Union Territories In 36 Volumes. Orissa · Volume 21 . Kalpaz

Holi
March observances
Hindu festivals
Bengali festivals
Hindu festivals in India
Spring festivals
Religious festivals in India
Traditions involving fire
Festivals in Assam